Alejandro Martínez Rodríguez (born April 10, 1990 in Torreón, Coahuila) is a Mexican professional footballer who plays for Celaya on loan from Santos Laguna of Liga MX.

External links
 Alejandro Martínez Rodríguez at Ascenso MX 
 

Liga MX players
Living people
1990 births
People from Torreón
Mexican footballers
Association footballers not categorized by position
21st-century Mexican people